This is a list of African-American newspapers that have been published in the state of New Jersey.  It includes both current and historical newspapers.  

Among the first such newspapers in New Jersey was Trenton's The Sentinel, established in 1880.  The Black press in New Jersey grew substantially in the early 20th century, from approximately 12 newspapers in 1900 to around 35 in 1940.

In addition to New Jersey-based newspapers, many communities in New Jersey have been served by newspapers published in New York or Philadelphia, such as the Philadelphia Independent.

Newspapers

See also 
List of African-American newspapers and media outlets
List of African-American newspapers in Delaware
List of African-American newspapers in New York
List of African-American newspapers in Pennsylvania
List of newspapers in New Jersey

Works cited

References 

Newspapers
New Jersey
African-American
African-American newspapers